Gaborone is the capital and largest city of Botswana with a population of 246,325 based on the 2022 census, about 10% of the total population of Botswana. Its agglomeration is home to 421,907 inhabitants at the 2011 census.

Gaborone is situated between Kgale Hill and Oodi Hill, near the confluence of the Notwane River and Segoditshane River in the south-eastern corner of Botswana,  from the South African border. The city is served by the Sir Seretse Khama International Airport. It is an administrative district in its own right, but is the capital of the surrounding South-East District. Locals often refer to the city as GC or Motse-Mshate.

The city of Gaborone is named after Chief Gaborone of the Tlokwa tribe, who once controlled land nearby. Because it had no tribal affiliation and was close to fresh water, the city was planned to be the capital in the mid-1960s when the Bechuanaland Protectorate became an independent nation. The centre of the city is a long strip of commercial businesses, called "Main Mall" with a semicircle-shaped area of government offices to its east. Gaborone was once one of the fastest-growing cities in the world, and this has created problems with housing and illegal settlements. The city has also dealt with conflicts spilling into the country from Zimbabwe and South Africa during the 1980s.

Gaborone is the economic capital as well as the government capital; it is headquarters to numerous companies and the Botswana Stock Exchange. Gaborone is also home to the Southern African Development Community (SADC), a regional economic community established in 1980. Many languages are spoken there, Setswana (Tswana) being the main tongue. English, Kalanga, and Kgalagadi are also spoken.

History

Evidence shows that there have been inhabitants along the Notwane River for centuries. In more recent history, the Tlokwa left the Magaliesberg ranges to settle in the area around 1880, and called the settlement Moshaweng . The word "Gaborone" literally means "it does not fit badly" or "it is not unbecoming". The city was then called "Gaberones" by early European colonizers. Gaberones, a shortening of "Gaborone's Village", was named after Chief Gaborone of the Tlokwa, whose home village (now called Tlokweng) was across the river from the Government Camp, the name of the colonial government headquarters. The nickname, "GC", comes from the name "Government Camp". In 1890, Cecil John Rhodes picked Gaberones to house a colonial fort. The fort was where Rhodes planned the Jameson Raid. The city changed its name from Gaberones to Gaborone in 1969.

The modern town was only founded in 1964, after a decision was taken to establish a capital for Botswana, which became a self governing territory in 1965, before becoming a fully independent republic on 30 September 1966.

In 1965, the capital of the Bechuanaland Protectorate moved from Mafeking to Gaberones. When Botswana gained its independence, Lobatse was the first choice as the nation's capital. However, Lobatse was deemed too limited, and instead, a new capital city would be created next to Gaberones. The city was chosen because of its proximity to a fresh water source, its proximity to the railway to Pretoria, its central location among the central tribes, and its lack of association with those surrounding tribes.

The city was planned under Garden city principles with numerous pedestrian walkways and open spaces. Building of Gaborone started in mid-1964. During the city's construction, the chairman of Gaberones Township Authority, Geoffrey Cornish, likened the layout of the city to a "brandy glass" with the government offices in the base of the glass and businesses in the "mall", a strip of land extending from the base.

Most of the early town was built within three years, as a small town designed to accommodate 20,000 people – only to later develop after independence into a modern city. Buildings in early Gaborone include assembly buildings, government offices, a power station, a hospital, schools, a radio station, a telephone exchange, police stations, a post office, and more than 1,000 houses. Because the town was built so quickly, there was a massive influx of labourers who had built illegal settlements on the new city's southern industrial development zone. These settlements were named Naledi. The latter term literally means "the star", but could also mean "under the open sky" or "a community that stands out from all others". In 1971, because of the growth of illegal settlements, the Gaborone Town Council and the Ministry of Local Government and Lands surveyed an area called Bontleng, which would contain low-income housing. However, Naledi still grew, and the demand for housing was greater than ever. In 1973, the Botswana Housing Corporation (BHC) built a "New Naledi" across the road from the "Old Naledi". Residents from Old Naledi would be moved to New Naledi. However, the demand for housing increased yet again; moreover, the residents who relocated to New Naledi disliked the houses. The problem was solved in 1975 when Sir Seretse Khama, the president of Botswana, rezoned Naledi from an industrial zone to a low-income housing area.

On 30 September 1966, Bechuanaland became the eleventh British dependency in Africa to become independent. The first mayor of Gaborone was Reverend Derek Jones. The old Gaberones became a suburb of the new Gaborone, and is now known as "the Village".

In the mid-1980s, South Africa attacked Botswana and conducted raids on Gaborone and other border towns. The Raid on Gaborone resulted in twelve deaths.

After the 1994 General Elections, riots started in Gaborone because of high unemployment and other issues.

Today, Gaborone is growing very rapidly. In 1964, Gaborone only had 3,855 citizens; seven years later, the city had almost 18,000 residents. The city originally planned on 20,000 citizens, but by 1992, the city had 138,000 people. This has led to many squatter settlements on undeveloped land. Former mayor Veronica Lesole has stated that Gaborone's development problems were caused by the original city planners.

Geography

Gaborone is surrounded by the following cities: Ramotswa to the southeast, Mogoditshane to the northwest, and Mochudi to the east, and Tlokweng across the river. Most of them are commuter towns for Gaborone. Suburbs in Gaborone include Broadhurst, Gaborone West, The Village, Naledi. Phakalane, an affluent suburb, lies about 13 km north of the city center.

In the centre of the city lies the Main Mall which houses many diplomatic missions. At the eastern end of the Mall, one can find the Civic Centre along with the Pula Arch that commemorates Botswana's independence. The Botswana Stock Exchange, National Museum and Art Gallery, and the main campus of the University of Botswana also lie near the Main Mall. To the west of the Main Mall is the Government Enclave. This area contains the governmental buildings such as the National Assembly of Botswana and Ntlo ya Dikgosi buildings. The National Archives building is also found here.

Climate
Gaborone has a hot semi-arid climate (Köppen climate classification BSh). Most of the year, Gaborone is very sunny. The summers are usually hot. The nights are cool. Usually, the summers with little rainfall are warmer than summers with regular rainfall. If there is a drought, the hottest temperatures of the year are usually in January or February. If there is normal rainfall, the hottest temperatures are usually in October, right before the rain starts. During the winter, days are still warm, and the nights are cold.

There are on average seventy-four days per year with temperatures above . There are on average 196 days per year with temperatures above . There are on average fifty-one days per year with temperatures below . There is on average one day per year with temperatures below .

Precipitation in Gaborone is scanty and erratic. Most of the rainfall in Gaborone falls during the summer months, between October and April. There are on average forty days of thunderstorms per year, most of them happening during the summer months, and four days of fog, usually happening during the winter months. Gaborone has been affected by three floods based on records going back to 1995, one in 2000, one in 2001 that caused an estimated 5,000,000 Botswana pula worth of damage, and one in 2006.

The highest humidity occurs in June at 90% while the lowest humidity is in September at 28%.

Solar irradiance ranges from 4.1 kWh m−2 d−1 in June to 7.3 kWh m−2 d−1 in December.

Demographics

The population, based on the 2022 census, is 246,325. There are 118,727 males and 127,598 females in the city.  There are 58,476 households in Gaborone. In 2001, the average household size was 3.11 people. The city of Gaborone is home to over 10% of the population of Botswana. Almost half of Botswana citizens live within  of Gaborone.

The population growth rate of Gaborone is 3.4%, the highest in the country. This is most likely because the city has a more developed infrastructure, making it more livable. Gaborone is one of the fastest-growing cities in the world. Much of the growth is based on net in migration from the rest of Botswana.

The sex ratio of Gaborone is 96.3, meaning that there are 963 men for every 1,000 women. Most of the marriages in Botswana are registered in Gaborone; about 15% of all marriages in Botswana were registered in Gaborone in 2007. On average, there are 3.3 persons per household in Gaborone. This is a low number compared to the rest of Botswana.

Places of worship 

Among places of worship, Christian churches and temples predominate. These include houses of worship affiliated with the Evangelical Lutheran Church in Botswana (Lutheran World Federation), Assemblies of God, International Pentecostal Holiness Church, Christ Embassy, Roman Catholic Diocese of Gaborone (Catholic Church). Accompanying a significant community of ethnic Serbs in the city, there are also two Serbian Orthodox churches within Gaborone; the St. Nicholas Church and the St. Sava Church.

Culture
The National Museum and Art Gallery is located just northwest of the Mall along Independence Road. The museum opened in 1968. It holds many things from traditional crafts to works of art by local artists. The museum houses original paintings by Thomas Baines and Lucas Sithole. Exhibits include Artists in Botswana, Children's Art Competition and Thapong International. Outside the museum, there are various forms of transportation such as wagons, sledges, and bakkies (pickup trucks). There is also an exhibit on the San, the earliest inhabitants of southern Africa. The museum opened a  botanical garden called the National Botanical Garden on 2 November 2007. The garden was built to protect Botswana's indigenous plant life, and 90% of its total plant species are native plants from Botswana.

The introduction of the ministry of youth sports and culture has immensely contributed to the growth of arts and culture, with few elements of culture used to create a living for the youth, the ministry buys the locally designed ornaments and artifacts. the culture depicted is not just a way of living but shared experience that improves individuals lives. with different crafts people of Gaborone have managed to sustain their lives, be it in sports, and or performing arts.

The Maitisong Festival was started in 1987 and is held every year for seven days on either the last week of March or the first week of April. The festival holds outdoor concerts, plays, and films in various venues around the city.

"My African Dream" was a performing-arts competition during the 2000s that was held every year at the Gaborone International Convention Center. The show featured many kwaito dancers and musicians.

The book series The No. 1 Ladies' Detective Agency, written by Scottish author Alexander McCall Smith, is set in Gaborone. The books follow Precious Ramotswe, the first female private detective in Botswana, and the mysteries that she solves.  The Detective Kubu series, by Michael Stanley (South African co-writers Michael Sears and Stanley Trollip), features Assistant Superintendent David 'Kubu' Bengu of the Botswana Police Service Criminal Investigation Department.

Economy
Gaborone is the center of the national economy. The headquarters of important financial institutions such as the Bank of Botswana, Bank Gaborone, BancABC, and the Botswana Stock Exchange are centrally located, as well as the headquarters for Air Botswana, Consumer Watchdog, Botswana Telecommunications Corporation, and Debswana, the joint diamond mining venture between De Beers and the Botswana government.
The Southern African Development Community (SADC) has its headquarters in Gaborone; the organization was formed in 1980 to increase economic cooperation among its members and reduce dependence on South Africa.

Several international companies have invested in the city: Hyundai, SABMiller, Daewoo, Volvo, and Siemens.

Orapa House, owned by Debswana, is where the diamonds mined from Debswana are sorted and valued. Orapa House is located at the intersection of Khama Crescent and Nelson Mandela Drive. It has a unique style of architecture that allows the optimal amount of indirect sunlight to shine through the windows in order to accurately sort diamonds.

A Diamond Technology Park was recently opened, this is as part of Botswana Government's vision for establishment of downstream diamond industry. Companies dealing in diamonds have established their local operations in the park.

The Botswana Resource Conference is held annually at the Gaborone International Conference Centre.

The unemployment rate in Gaborone is 11.7% . 19.7% of the population in Gaborone is employed in the financial sector.

According to Mercer's 2011 Worldwide Cost of Living Survey, Gaborone has the 195th highest cost of living for expatriates in the world, up from 203rd in 2010. Gaborone comes between Chennai, India and Quito, Ecuador. Gaborone is the fourth least expensive city for expatriates in Africa, coming in above Addis Ababa, Ethiopia at 211th, Kampala, Uganda at 202nd and Windhoek, Namibia at 198th.

Sports
There are several football stadiums located in and around Gaborone. These include SSKB Stadium, Mochudi Stadium, and Botswana National Stadium. There are also several football teams representing Gaborone, which include, amongst others, Botswana Defence Force XI, Gaborone United, Police XI, Township Rollers and Uniao Flamengo Santos FC, which is based in nearby Gabane; all of them have played in the Botswana Premier League. The Botswana national football team plays in the National Stadium, but has never qualified for the FIFA World Cup, even though they recently qualified for the Africa Cup of Nations, held in Gabon in January 2012.

The Botswana Cricket Association, the governing body of cricket in Botswana, is headquartered in Gaborone. There are two Ovals where cricket is played in the city.

The Steinmetz Gaborone Marathon, the second marathon in Botswana, was held for the first time on 18 April 2010. The route started at the Phakalane Golf Estate in Phakalane, north of the city, and went through Gaborone, passing the National Assembly Building. The marathon, which was cancelled in 2011, has been held annually starting from 2012.

Parks and recreation
The Gaborone Dam is located south of Gaborone along the Gaborone-Lobatse road, and provides water for both Gaborone and Lobatse. The dam is the second biggest in Botswana, able to hold . It is also starting to be marketed as a recreational area. The northern end of the reservoir is planned to become an entertainment venue called The Waterfront. There is a yacht club, called Gaborone Yacht Club, also on the northern side of the lake. The southern end houses the Kalahari Fishing Club and a new public facility called City Scapes. City Scapes contains parks, playgrounds, and boating facilities. The dam is popular with birdwatchers, windsurfers, and anglers. However, there is no swimming due to the presence of crocodiles and parasitic bilharzias.

Wildlife

The Gaborone Game Reserve is a  park east of the city on Limpopo Drive. The reserve was built in 1988 and is now the third-busiest in Botswana. Examples of animals in the park are impala, kudu, ostriches, wildebeest, zebras, gemsbok, bushbuck, springbok, duiker, common eland, and common warthogs. The park is a destination for birdwatching. Birds in the marshy section of the park include snake eagles, boubou, gallinule, kingfishers, and hornbills.

Kgale Hill is located a few hundred metres from the city. There are three different paths to reach the top, usually taking two hours.

The Mokolodi Nature Reserve is a  reserve that was created in 1994. There are many different species of animals found in the park such as common warthogs, steenbok, kudu, zebras, giraffes, common eland, ostriches, hippos and rhinos. The park helps with wildlife projects in Botswana that include: the reintroduction of the white rhino and the relocation of "problem" cheetahs. Mokolodi also holds the Education Centre, which teaches children about the conservation projects.

Somarelang Tikologo (Environment Watch Botswana) is a member-based environmental NGO housed inside an ecological park at the heart of Gaborone. The aim of the organization is to promote sustainable environmental protection by educating, demonstrating and encouraging best practices in environmental planning, resource conservation and waste management in Botswana.  The park was officially opened by the Botswana Minister of Environment, Wildlife and Tourism, Onkokame kitso Mokaila on 27 February 2009.  The park contains a playground for children to play on throughout the day, a community organic garden, a recycling drop-off center, and a shop where visitors can purchase products made of recycled material.

Government

Local government

Gaborone is controlled by the Gaborone City Council, the wealthiest council in Botswana. It is composed of 35 councillors representing the wards of Gaborone. The Townships Act mandates the structure of local governments in Botswana. Because Botswana is a unitary state, the power of the local councils are delegated from the national level. The Ministry of Local Government, Land and Housing has a major influence in terms of personnel hiring and training, budgeting, and development planning.

The city commission-style council is run by the city clerk and the deputy city clerk. The city is governed by the mayor, deputy mayor, and several committees run by councillors: the financial and general purposes committee; the public health, social welfare and housing committee; the Self-Help Housing Agency (SHAA) management committee; the town planning committee; the trade licensing committee; and the education committee. The councillors elect the mayor in a first-past-the-post system and place each other in the committees yearly. The council has 2,515 employees.

An income tax called the Local Government Tax used to be the main source of income of the city council, but it was abolished. Today, the city council derives most of its revenue from property rates. City councillors feel that because of recurrent obligations, they have little room to institute new solutions.

The city council has been criticised by the Botswana Association of Local Authorities for its closed elections and minimal authority. In 2010, the council had problems with waste management: Frenic, the waste management company hired by the city, sued the Gaborone City Council for unpaid compensation. This has led to a buildup of uncollected garbage. Haskins Nkaigwa, mayor of Gaborone from 2011, has stressed the importance of more local autonomy. He advocates for a stronger city council with the power to determine budgets and hire and fire clerks and officers.

National government
Gaborone is the political centre of Botswana. Most government buildings are located west of the Main Mall in an area called the Government Enclave. The National Assembly of Botswana, the Ntlo ya Dikgosi, the National Archives, the Department of Taxes and Attorney General's Chambers Building, and the Ministry of Health. Near the entrance of the parliament building, there is a statue of Sir Seretse Khama, Botswana's first president as well as a memorial dedicated to the three hundred Batswana who were killed from 1939 to 1945. Another monument pays tribute to the Botswana Defence Force soldiers who died in the Rhodesian Bush War.

Before 1982, Gaborone held one parliamentary constituency, one seat in the Parliament of Botswana. From 1982 to 1993, Gaborone was divided into two constituencies, Gaborone North and Gaborone South. A third seat in Parliament was given to a member elected for the whole city of Gaborone. In January 1993, two new constituencies were created: Gaborone West and Gaborone Central. For local government elections, the four constituencies were divided into wards. Gaborone North had seven, Gaborone West had seven. Gaborone Central had six, and Gaborone South had five. In 2019, the city had five constituencies: Gaborone North, Gaborone Central, Gaborone South, Gaborone West North, and Gaborone West South.

An International Law Enforcement Academy (ILEA) was established on 24 July 2000 in Gaborone. The academy would provide training for middle managers for the countries in the Southern African Development Community (SADC).

There are 21 diplomatic missions in Gaborone.

Education

There are more people who have earned a degree or postgraduate qualifications in Gaborone than anywhere else in Botswana. 70.9% of the population of Gaborone have earned at least a secondary-level education 2.6% of the population of Gaborone has never attended school.

Gaborone has many primary and secondary schools, both public and private. These include Westwood International School, Maru-a-Pula School, St. Joseph's College, Kgale, Legae Academy, Northside Primary School, Thornhill Primary School and Hillcrest International School. Seventeen of the sixty private schools in Botswana are located in Gaborone.

The main campus of the University of Botswana (which was established in 1982) is on the eastern extent of the city.

Further, in year 2006, the Gaborone Universal College of Law, opened its main campus in Gaborone, with its first group of students graduating in 2010.

Media
Newspapers published in Gaborone include Mmegi, The Botswana Gazette, The Monitor, Midweek Sun, The Patriot on Sunday, Sunday Standard, and The Voice. Magazines published are Lapologa, Peolwane, Kutwlano among others.

Radio station Yarona FM broadcasts from Gaborone; its frequency in Gaborone is 106.6 FM. Another small, local radio station in Gaborone is Gabz FM, Duma FM & Yarona FM. 86.6% of Gaborone households own a working radio.

Before 2000, residents of Gaborone received television programming from BOP TV in Mahikeng via a repeating transmitter on the summit of Kgale Hill. Today, the Gaborone Broadcasting Company and Botswana TV provide television programming for Gaborone. 78.7% of the households in Gaborone have a working television. Other local channels based in Gaborone are Now TV, Khuduga HD, Access TV & Maru TV.

93.7% of the households in Gaborone have a cell phone.

Infrastructure

Gaborone is one of the fastest-growing cities in Africa. The growth of Gaborone, especially suburban growth, has caused much of the farmland surrounding the city to be absorbed into the city. Much of the food for Gaborone comes from north of the city with some smaller-scale farms on the southern end.
The city centre was planned to be functionalist, with major buildings designed and built in the style of Modern architecture. The city is surrounded by smaller buildings. The city's central business district (CBD) is still under construction so when one says downtown, they actually mean the Main Mall and Government Enclave areas where tall buildings are usually found. The Main Mall, a car-free shopping and commercial area, runs in an east–west direction with the Government Enclave and National Assembly on the west end and the Gaborone City Town Council complex on the east.

Gaborone's CBD is home to the new Square Mall, The Tower, the new SADC headquarters, the Industrial Court, a court specifically for settling trade disputes, and the Three Dikgosi Monument, a landmark featuring the statues of Khama III, Sebele I, and Bathoen I, three dikgosi, or chiefs, who traveled to Great Britain to establish the Bechuanaland Protectorate separate from Southern Rhodesia (present-day Zimbabwe) or the Cape Colony (present-day South Africa). The monument was inaugurated on 29 September 2005. While the statues represent famous historical figures, there has been some controversy over the cost of the construction, P12,000,000 (approx. US$1.7M, €1.4M, or £1.1M as of June 2010), and over the construction company, North Korean Mansudae Overseas Projects, putting the wrong inscription date. Other buildings under construction in the CBD include the Holiday Inn Gaborone, retail space, and office space.

Utilities
The city gets most of its water from the reservoir formed from the Gaborone Dam on the southeast side of the city, which has facilitated growth. The city of Gaborone was originally constructed as a small town, so the Gaborone Dam needed to be built to provide water for all its citizens.

From 2007 to 2008,  of water was sold in Gaborone.

Gaborone has some of the highest water tariffs in the country because of high transportation costs and high water consumption. The high tariffs may also be due to the fact that some of Gaborone's water supply is imported from the Letsibogo Dam.

The average pH of the water in the Gaborone Dam is 7.95 as of February 2006. The concentration of calcium in the reservoir was 14.87milligrams per litre from April 2001 to August 2006. During the same period, the concentration of calcium carbonate (CaCO3) was 57.73 milligrams per litre, slightly over Botswana's ideal concentration which means the water is hard. Also during the same period, the chloride concentration was 6.44 mg/l, the fluoride concentration was 0.54 mg/l, the potassium concentration was 6.72 mg/l, and the sodium concentration was 10.76 mg/l.

Healthcare

The Botswana Red Cross Society, established in 1968, is headquartered in Gaborone. The Princess Marina Hospital is the main referral hospital in Gaborone and houses 500 beds.
There is also Gaborone Private Hospital and Sidilega Private Hospital all operating in the city of Gaborone. 
The Cancer Association of Botswana is a voluntary non-governmental organization established as a trust in 1998. The association is a leading service provider in supplementing existing services through provision of cancer prevention and health promotion programmes, facilitating access to health services for cancer patients and offering support and counselling to those affected.  Its headquarters is at Ditlhakore Way, Extension 12, Gaborone.

HIV/AIDS

AIDS is a very serious problem in Gaborone. 17,773 Gaborone citizens, 17.1% of the total population of Gaborone, have tested positive for HIV. There is a higher prevalence of HIV among women; 20.5% of women have tested positive compared to 13.6% of men. The population between 45 and 49 years of age are most likely to have AIDS with 35.4% of the residents in that age group testing positive.

HIV/AIDS education is extensive in Gaborone. However, a 2008 study shows that 14.5% of Gaborone residents between 10 and 64 who have heard of HIV/AIDS believe that HIV can be spread through witchcraft, and 31.3% of the residents believe HIV can be spread through mosquito bites.

Transportation

Railways

The railway that served the founding purpose of the city remains important, bisecting the city in a north–south direction. Botswana Railways runs a line that goes from Cape Town to Harare via Bulawayo. The railway station in Gaborone is located south of the Parliament House in the city's centre. The line stops at the following cities in and near Botswana: Ramatlabama on the South African border, Lobatse, Gaborone, Palapye, Serule, Francistown, Ramokgwebana, and Plumtree, Zimbabwe. The line became a cargo-only line on 1 April 2009 but passenger services resumed in early 2016.

Airports

It is the headquarters of Air Botswana, the national airline of Botswana.

In 2008, Sir Seretse Khama International Airport handled 15,844 aircraft movements, second only to Maun Airport (ICAO code: FMBN IATA code: MUB) Air traffic in Gaborone has decreased since 2006. However, Gaborone has the most air passenger traffic, accounting for 51.6% of all passenger movement in Botswana. International passengers total 244,073 passengers while domestic air passenger movement comes up to 333,390 passengers.  Gaborone International Airport terminal was rebuilt into a modern terminal in 2010.

Roads

Highways in and around Gaborone include the Trans-Kalahari Highway, A1 Highway, A10 Highway and the Cairo-Cape Town Highway. There are five major roads in Gaborone that go to Lobatse, Kanye, Molepolole, Francistown via Mochudi, and Tlokweng.

Public transport
Kombi

Public transport in the city is generally reliable, when compared with major African cities. Kombis (small vans) and taxis ply the routes within the city, while buses serve surrounding villages and other towns in Botswana.

Private traffic
Gaborone has several vehicle licensing stations. 15,538 new private motor vehicles, accounting for 46.5% of Botswana's total new vehicle registrations, were registered in Gaborone in 2008, of which 8,440 were passenger cars, 440 were minibuses, 204 were motorcycles, and 181 were tractors. The total has increased from 12,690 new vehicle registrations in 2007. Gaborone also has the highest number of vehicle registration renewals at 73,206 in 2008.

Including the district of Gaborone West, Gaborone had 9,415 vehicle accidents with 74 human fatalities in 2008. Most of the traffic collisions in that year, 3,146 collisions, were side collisions. 263 accidents involved animals. The city has also seen 679 pedestrian casualties in 2008; 24 pedestrians were killed. The majority of vehicle accident casualties involved pedestrians, and most traffic accidents occur between 16:00 and 18:00.

Notable people

 Kgosi Gaborone ( 1825–1931), Motswana chief, after whom the city is named
 Alec Campbell (1932–2012), archaeologist and museum curator
 Thamsanga Mnyele (1948–1985), member of the African National Congress and artist
 Vernon Nkadimeng (1958–1985), member of the African National Congress, killed in Gaborone by the apartheid police
 Boniface Tshosa Setlalekgosi (b. 1927), Roman Catholic bishop of the Diocese of Gaborone, Botswana from 1981 to 2009
 Wally Serote (b. 1944), poet and anti-apartheid activist
 Dipsy Selolwane (b. 1978), football player
 Mpule Kwelagobe (b. 1979), Miss World Botswana 1997, Miss Universe Botswana 1999 and Miss Universe 1999
 Alister Walker (b. 1982), squash player
 Abednico Powell (b. 1983), football player
 Joel Mogorosi (b. 1984), football player
 Dirang Moloi (b. 1985), member of the Botswana national football team
 Donald Molosi (b. 1985), actor, writer and playwright attended Maru a Pula School in his teens, and the National Arts Festival in South Africa
 Sumaiyah Marope ( 1987), Miss Botswana 2009
 Emma Wareus (b. 1990), Miss World Botswana 2010, first runner-up to Miss World 2010
 Matsieng, a Setswana traditional music group, formed in Gaborone in 2005

International relations 
Gaborone has been twinned with:
 Burbank, United States
 Sorong, Indonesia
 Worcester, South Africa
 Walvis Bay, Namibia

Gallery

References

External links

 Gaborone City Council Website
 Gaborone Satellite view at WikiMapia (not affiliated with Wikipedia/Wikimedia Foundation)
 Gaborone Encyclopædia Britannica entry
 Map of Gaborone

 
Capitals in Africa
Cities in Botswana
South-East District (Botswana)
District capitals in Botswana
Populated places established in 1964
Planned capitals
1964 establishments in Africa
New towns started in the 1960s